Rhizophagus may refer to:
 Rhizophagus (fungus), a genus in the family Glomeraceae
 Rhizophagus (beetle), a genus in the family Monotomidae